The Ministry of Intergovernmental Affairs is responsible for intergovernmental affairs between the Canadian province of Ontario and the other provinces and territories and the Canadian government. The ministry's goal is to strengthen national unity and Ontario's role within Canada. The current Minister is the Honourable Doug Ford, also Premier of Ontario; the position is often held concurrently by the Premier.

The Provincial Secretary and Registrar of Ontario, Minister of Economics and Provincial Relations and Ministry of Federal-Provincial Relations were the positions formerly responsible for intergovernmental affairs.

List of Ministers

Treasurer of Ontario, Economics, and Intergovernmental Affairs
 Darcy McKeough, 1972 (April–September)
 Charles MacNaughton, 1972–1973
 John White, 1973–1975
 Darcy McKeough, 1975–1978
 Frank Miller, 1978 (August 16–18)

Intergovernmental Affairs

Asterisks indicate ministers who were concurrently Premier of Ontario.

 Thomas Leonard Wells, 1978–1985
 Frank Miller, 1985 (February–May)
 Reuben Baetz, 1985 (May-June)
 David Peterson, 1985–1990 *
 Bob Rae, 1990–1995 *
 Dianne Cunningham, 1995–1999
 Norm Sterling, 1999–2001
 Brenda Elliott, 2001–2003
 Dalton McGuinty, 2003–2005 *
 Marie Bountrogianni, 2005–2007
 Dalton McGuinty, 2007–2010 *
 Monique Smith, 2010–2011
 Dalton McGuinty, 2011–2013 *
 Laurel Broten, 2013 (February–July)
 Kathleen Wynne, 2013–2018 *
 Doug Ford, 2018—present *

See also
 Foreign relations of Canada
 Alberta International and Intergovernmental Relations
 Quebec Ministry of International Relations
 Saskatchewan Ministry of Intergovernmental Affairs

Intergovernmental Affairs